The Other Half is a 2016 Canadian romantic drama film, written and directed by Joey Klein. It stars Tatiana Maslany, Tom Cullen, Henry Czerny, and Suzanne Clément. The film had its world premiere at South by Southwest on 12 March 2016.

Premise
A bipolar woman and grief-stricken man struggle to live a simple life.

Cast
 Tatiana Maslany as Emily
 Tom Cullen as Nickie
 Henry Czerny as Jacob
 Suzanne Clément as Marie
 Mark Rendall as Sammy
 Diana Bentley as Kristin
 Deragh Campbell as Anna
 Nancy Palk as Katherine
 Kaleb Alexander as Johnny
 Zachary Hillard-Forde as Tommy
 Emmanuel Kabongo as Officer James

Production
In July 2015, it was revealed that Joey Klein would write and direct the film, with Tatiana Maslany, Tom Cullen, Suzanne Clément, Deragh Campbell, and Mark Rendall starring in the film.

Release
The film had its world premiere at South by Southwest on 12 March 2016. Mongrel Media distributed the film in Canada, releasing it on 2 December 2016.

Reception
The film received positive critical reviews. On review aggregator website Rotten Tomatoes, it has an approval rating of 78% based on 18 reviews, with an average rating of 6.9/10. On Metacritic, the film has a weighted average score of 60 out of 100, based on 9 critics, indicating "generally favorable reviews".

The Los Angeles Times said that the film is "a granular depiction of trauma, illness and protectiveness disguised as a love story and guided by a pair of intense portrayals", and that, "as it plays out, it’s only a hard road for these swept-up, damaged lovers, whom Klein and his actors treat with blessedly non-exploitative honesty." Variety wrote, "What might have seemed pro forma on paper overcomes its occasionally studied stylistic tics to become a troubled, anguished love story that neither exaggerates nor soft-pedals the demons on display."

The Toronto Star praised Klein, saying that he "creates a mood of tension, foreboding and sombre reflection through occasional moments of slo-mo and camera work that blurs reality. His literate script offers no easy resolution, only the faint hope that love can rescue two lost souls."

References

External links
 
 The Other Half at Library and Archives Canada

2016 films
English-language Canadian films
Canadian romantic drama films
Films directed by Joey Klein
2010s English-language films
2010s Canadian films